The 2001 World Rowing Championships were held from 19 to 26 August 2001 at Rotsee in Lucerne, Switzerland.

Medal summary

Men
 Non-Olympic classes

Women
 Non-Olympic classes

Medal table

References

World Rowing Championships
World Rowing Championships
Rowing Championships
Rowing Championships
Rowing competitions in Switzerland
Sport in Lucerne
Rowing